BVDU is the abbreviation for:

 Brivudine (bromovinyldeoxyuridine), an antiviral drug
 Bharati Vidyapeeth Deemed University